Lobbe is a surname which may refer to:
Carlos Ignacio Fernández Lobbe (born 20 November 1974), Argentine rugby union footballer
Juan Martín Fernández Lobbe (born 19 November 1981), Argentine rugby union footballer
Matthew Lobbe (born 12 February 1989), Australian-Rules Football player